The Hoffelt Drug Store, located at 212 Main St. in Estelline, South Dakota, was built in 1911.  It was listed on the National Register of Historic Places in 2008.

It is a one-story commercial building with a brick facade with concrete accents.

It was deemed architecturally notable as "an excellent example of a one-part, vernacular commercial block constructed in Hamlin County during the early twentieth century. This building is not only intact, but its contents are intact, with most of the original furnishings, including soda fountain, tables and chairs, light fixtures, cabinets and even pharmaceutical tools, bottles and labels."

References

Commercial buildings on the National Register of Historic Places in South Dakota
Commercial buildings completed in 1911
National Register of Historic Places in Hamlin County, South Dakota
1911 establishments in South Dakota
Pharmacies on the National Register of Historic Places